This was the first edition of the tournament.

Bogdan Bobrov and Sergey Fomin won the title after defeating Sarp Ağabigün and Ergi Kırkın 6–2, 5–7, [11–9] in the final.

Seeds

Draw

References

External links
 Main draw

Kiskút Open - Doubles